Uzodinma Asonye is an American attorney. He is a partner at Davis Polk & Wardwell and the former Deputy Chief of the Financial Crimes and Public Corruption office at the Eastern District of Virginia.

Early life and education

Asonye was born to a Nigerian American family. He attended Homewood-Flossmoor High School in Flossmoor, Illinois, graduating in 1998. He earned his bachelor's degree from Cornell University, where he was a member of the Quill and Dagger society, and his Juris Doctor from Yale Law School.

Career

After college, he worked for the law firm O'Melveny & Myers, before joining the United States Attorney's office as deputy chief in the financial crimes and public corruption unit. Robert Mueller brought Asonye onto the Special Counsel investigation team. Asonye was the lead attorney of Paul Manafort's Virginia criminal trial. In 2021, he joined Davis Polk & Wardwell as a member of the firm's white collar team.

References

20th-century births
Living people
Illinois lawyers
Cornell University alumni
Yale Law School alumni
Members of the 2017 Special Counsel investigation team
People from Chicago
Year of birth missing (living people)
Homewood-Flossmoor High School alumni

American people of Nigerian descent